The Wavelength 35 is an American sailboat that was designed by Paul Lindenberg as a racer-cruiser and first built in 1980.

The Wavelength series of boats is named for the prototype Lindenberg 30 which was a boat named Wavelength.

Production
The design was built by W. D. Schock Corp in the United States starting in 1983, but it is now out of production.

Design
The Wavelength 35 is a racing keelboat, built predominantly of fiberglass, with wood trim. It has a masthead sloop rig, an internally mounted spade-type rudder and a fixed fin keel. It displaces .

See also
List of sailing boat types

References

Keelboats
1980s sailboat type designs
Sailing yachts
Sailboat type designs by Paul Lindenberg
Sailboat types built by W. D. Schock Corp